A curtain rod, curtain rail, curtain pole, or traverse rod is a device used to suspend curtains, usually above windows or along the edges of showers or bathtubs, though also wherever curtains might be used. When found in bathrooms, curtain rods tend to be telescopic and self-fixing, while curtain rods in other areas of the home are often affixed with decorative brackets or finial.
Special poles can be made for bay windows or made by joining a number of straight and corner bends to fit the shape of a bay window.

Bathtubs

Bathtubs can use L-shaped or oval-shaped curtain rods, mainly when only one wall can be used.

Construction 

Curtain rods can be made of many materials including wood, metal and plastic. Curtain rods come in almost endless styles and designs. Not all curtain rods are simple straight poles; curved and hinged poles are available from numerous companies, allowing installation in bay windows and around curved walls and corners. Curtain rods can also be shaped like a crane or exhibit a swing arm design. Prices and quality of curtain rods are as varied as designs from inexpensive big-box store products to high-end specialty products made by companies catering to interior designers and architects.

History

18 years following the invention of the curtain rod by Samuel R. Scottron in 1892, the flat, telescoping curtain rod was invented by Charles W. Kirsch, of Sturgis, Michigan, in 1907. However, they were not in use until the 1920s. Kirsch also invented the traverse curtain rod in 1928.

See also

 Curtain ring
 Shower curtain

References

Furnishings